Shi Tianze (1202 – 5 March 1275) was a general in the early period of the Yuan dynasty. Later, he was promoted to the post of deputy prime minister and became the first ethnic Chinese minister of the Yuan dynasty. He played a key role in early Yuan politics.

Life
Shi Tianze was an ethnic Han who lived in the Jin dynasty. Interethnic marriage between Han and Jurchen became common at this time. His father was Shi Bingzhi (Shih Ping-chih, 史秉直). Shi Bingzhi was married to a Jurchen woman (surname Na-ho) and a Han woman (surname Chang), it is unknown which of them was Shi Tianze's mother. 

Shi Tianze married two Jurchen women, a Han woman, and a Korean woman, and his son Shi Gang was born to one of his Jurchen wives. His Jurchen wive's surnames were Mo-nien and Na-ho, his Korean wife's surname was Li, and his Han wife's surname was Shi. 

Shi Tianze defected to the Mongol Empire's forces upon their invasion of the Jin dynasty. Shi, Zhang Rou (Chang Jou) zh, and Yan Shi (Yen Shih) zh and other high ranking Han who served in the Jin dynasty and defected to the Mongols helped build the structure for the administration of the new state.

Family of Shi Tianze

References

Yuan dynasty right chancellors
Yuan dynasty generals
1202 births
1275 deaths
13th-century Chinese military personnel